Academic standards are the benchmarks of quality and excellence in education such as the rigour of curricula and the difficulty of examinations. The creation of universal academic standards requires agreement on rubrics, criteria or other systems of coding academic achievement. At colleges and universities, faculty are under increasing pressure from administrators to award students good marks and grades without regard for those students' actual abilities, both to keep those students in school paying tuition and to boost the schools' graduation rates. Students often use course evaluations to criticize any instructor who they feel has been making the course too difficult, even if an objective evaluation would show that the course has been too easy. It is very difficult to find a direct correlation between the quality of the course and the outcome of the course evaluations.

Assessment
Student evaluations are a controversial method of assessing academic achievement. Recent studies have correlated high student evaluation of instructors with high grades rather than mastery of content. Studies have also noted that students' understanding of assessment criteria can lead to enhanced learning experiences.

Globalization and academic standards 
According to a 2009 report by UNESCO, changes in the university structure in the late 20th and early 21st century have led to increasing access to or "massification" of higher education which has, in turn, resulted in both a diversification of the student population but also a general decrease in academic standards globally.

United Kingdom
In the UK, degree awarding bodies themselves are responsible for standards in higher education, but these are checked during inspection by the Quality Assurance Agency for Higher Education (QAA) and the Office of Qualifications and Examinations Regulation (Ofqual).  On its website QAA defines academic standards as 'The standards set and maintained by institutions for their courses (programmes and modules) and expected for their awards.'

The Dearing Report recommended in 1997 that benchmarking be used to measure and improve academic standards. From 1997 to 2011 this was done by code of practice and other guidelines known as the Academic Infrastructure.  During 2012-13, this was replaced by the Quality Code for Higher Education, which included points about the availability of information about the learning experience to emphasize the role of the student as a paying customer of the institutions.

United States
In the USA, regulation is at state level by bodies such as the Standards and Assessment Division of the Arizona Department of Education.

Types of academic standards 

The Common Core is a group of academic standards which focus on two main subjects: mathematics and English language arts (ELA). These standards are intended to ensure mastery of information and prepare students for entry into the next grade and beyond. The core originated as a way to standardize the way students were taught from state-to-state, and also the quality of information students received. The Common Core has now been adopted by 42 states in the US.

The Common Core standards are:
 Research- and evidence-based
 Clear, understandable, and consistent
 Aligned with college and career expectations
 Based on rigorous and application of knowledge through higher order thinking skills
 Built upon the strengths and lessons of current state standards
 Informed by other top performing countries in order to prepare all students for success in our global economy and society

See also
 Academic achievement
 Educational accreditation

References